The Terre Haute Post Office and Federal Building is a historic structure in Terre Haute, Indiana.

The first post office and federal building at this site opened in 1887. When this building was demolished in 1933, work began on the current structure. (The columns and pediment from the first post office now make up part of the Chauncey Rose Memorial in Terre Haute's Fairbanks Park.) The current building was funded as Public Work Project under the presidency of Franklin D. Roosevelt.

The three-story Art Deco-style post office was built 1934 to the designs of Terre Haute-based architects Miller & Yeager for the cost of around $450,000. Completed on December 1, 1934, the building opened to the public in 1935. It originally was home to the post office, the Social Security Administration, the Federal Bureau of Investigation, the Internal Revenue Service and the federal court. The federal courtroom features a mural by Frederick Webb Ross titled "The Signing of the Magna Carta."

The building was placed on the National Register of Historic Places in 1984.

In 2007, the GSA turned over the facility to Indiana State; following a $30-million dollar, multi-year renovation; the building became the new home of the Indiana State University Scott College of Business.  The first classes were held during the Fall 2012 semester.

See also 
List of United States post offices

References 

Federal buildings in the United States
Post office buildings in Indiana
Government buildings on the National Register of Historic Places in Indiana
National Register of Historic Places in Terre Haute, Indiana
Post office buildings on the National Register of Historic Places in Indiana
Government buildings completed in 1934
1930s architecture in the United States
Art Deco architecture in Indiana
1934 establishments in Indiana